Argjent Mustafa (born 30 August 1992) is a Kosovar-Albanian professional footballer who plays as an attacking midfielder for KF Drenica in the Football Superleague of Kosovo.

Club career

Early career
Mustafa began his career at his local team Kosova Vushtrri, where he played for the youth teams. He joined FC Prishtina in 2008 and played for their youth team for a year before joining the senior team. He was loaned back out to Kosova Vushtrri in October 2009 for the remainder of the 2009–10 season.

Partizani Tirana
Mustafa signed a three-year contract with Partizani Tirana on 29 May 2014 on a free transfer and he was unveiled to the media the same day. He made his official debut with the team on the opening day of the 2014–15 season in a 1–1 draw against Laçi, where he came on at half time for Jurgen Vatnikaj. After making 10 appearances in the first part of the season, including 6 in league, Mustafa announced his departure by breaking his contract with the club.

Laçi
Shortly after he left Partizani Tirana he joined another Albanian Superliga side in the shape of KF Laçi as a free agent.

Tirana
On 1 September 2016, Mustafa joined Tirana on a two-year deal. During the course of 2016–17 season, he did not make a single appearance for the club due to injury, as Tirana was relegated for the first time in history and won Albanian Cup for the 16th time, setting a new record.

Kamza
On 7 August 2017, Mustafa completed a transfer to newly promoted side Kamza by penning a two-year contract.

International career
He was part of the Kosovo national team that participated in the 2008 Coppa Gaetano Scirea, an unofficial friendly tournament which Kosovo were eliminated in the semi finals in.

Honours
Laçi
 Albanian Cup: 2012–13, 2014–15

References

External links
Football Database profile

1992 births
Living people
Sportspeople from Vushtrri
Association football midfielders
Kosovan footballers
FC Prishtina players
KF Vushtrria players
KF Trepça players
Besa Kavajë players
FK Partizani Tirana players
KF Laçi players
KF Tirana players
FC Kamza players
Flamurtari Vlorë players
KF Drenica players
Football Superleague of Kosovo players
Kategoria Superiore players
Kosovan expatriate footballers
Kosovan expatriate sportspeople in Albania
Expatriate footballers in Albania